The Donald P. Eckman Award is an award given by the American Automatic Control Council recognizing outstanding achievements by a young researcher under the age of 35 in the field of control theory. Together with the Richard E. Bellman Control Heritage Award, the Eckman Award is one of the most prestigious awards in control theory.

Recipients
 
 1964: Michael Athans
 1965: John Bollinger
 1966: Roger Bakke
 1967: Roger W. Brockett
 1968: Robert E. Larson
 1969: W. Harmon Ray
 1970: John Seinfeld
 1971: Raman Mehra
 1972: Cecil L. Smith
 1973: Edison Tse
 1974: Timothy L. Johnson
 1975: Alan S. Willsky
 1976: Robert W. Atherton
 1977: Nils R. Sandell, Jr.
 1978: Narendra K. Gupta
 1979: Joe Hong Chow
 1980: Manfred Morari
 1981: Rajan Suri
 1982: Bruce Hajek
 1983: John C. Doyle
 1984: Mark A. Shayman
 1985: P.R. Kumar
 1986: Yaman Arkun
 1987: Rahmatallah Shoureshi
 1988: Bijoy K. Ghosh
 1989: Pramod P. Khargonekar
 1990: Shankar S. Sastry
 1991: Carl N. Nett
 1992: Stephen P. Boyd
 1993: Munther A. Dahleh
 1994: Kameshwar Poolla
 1995: Andrew Packard
 1996: Jeff S. Shamma
 1997: Richard M. Murray
 1998: Ioannis Kanellakopoulos
 1999: Andrew R. Teel
 2000: Richard D. Braatz
 2001: Dawn M. Tilbury
 2002: Ilya Kolmanovsky
 2003: Claire J. Tomlin
 2004: Panagiotis D. Christofides
 2005: Pablo A. Parrilo
 2006: Murat Arcak
 2007: Daniel Liberzon
 2008: Asuman Özdağlar
 2009: Paulo Tabuada
 2010: Domitilla Del Vecchio
 2011: Hana El-Samad
 2012: Jason Marden
 2013: Vijay Gupta
 2014: Hamsa Balakrishnan
 2015: Aaron D. Ames
 2016: Javad Lavaei
 2017: Ketan Savla
 2018: Behrouz Touri
 2019: Na (Lina) Li
 2020: Samuel Coogan
 2021: Xudong Chen
 2022: Yongxin Chen

See also

 List of engineering awards

References

External links
 AACC page

Systems sciences awards